The Dutch Eerste Divisie in the 2001–02 season was contested by 18 teams. FC Zwolle won the championship.

Promoted Teams
These teams were promoted to the Eredivisie
 Zwolle — Eerste Divisie champions
 RBC Roosendaal — playoff Group A winners
 Excelsior Rotterdam — playoff Group B winners

New entrants
Relegated from the 2000–01 Eredivisie
 RBC Roosendaal
''Telstar merged with Stormvogels this season to form Stormvogels/Telstar

League standings

Playoff standings

See also
 2001–02 Eredivisie
 2001–02 KNVB Cup

References
Netherlands - List of final tables (RSSSF)

Eerste Divisie seasons
2001–02 in Dutch football
Neth